Leurospondylus is a genus of plesiosaur whose family is currently disputed, but is suggested to be Plesiosauridae.

Etymology
The name Leurospondylus comes from a fusion of two Greek words, leuros (λευρός) meaning "even", "flat" or "smooth", and spondylos (σπόνδυλος) meaning "vertebra." The name of the type species L. ultimus comes from the Latin ultimus meaning "last." It was so named because this genus was the latest known occurrence of a fossil plesiosaur when it was described in 1913."

Description
The first described Leurospondylus was a juvenile. Samuel Paul Welles noted that the vertebrae are short and similar to those of pliosaurs, while the scapulae and coracoids bear resemblance to those of elasmosaurids, thus making it difficult to determine to which family it belongs. There is some speculation that the Leurospondylus specimen is either a juvenile of a known species, or in its own, unrecognized taxonomic group.

Distribution
The first Leurospondylus was found in the brackish paleoenvironment represented by the Edmonton beds located on the present-day Red Deer River. This area is part of the Horseshoe Canyon Formation in Alberta, Canada. The occurrence of this juvenile fossil in an identifiably brackish environment led to the conclusion that plesiosaurs spent their early lives in rivers and estuaries. However, some plesiosaurs spent their adult lives in fresh water also; whether Leurospondylus grew up and then left, or grew up and stayed in a fresh water ecosystem has not been determined.

See also

 List of plesiosaur genera
 Timeline of plesiosaur research

References

External links
https://web.archive.org/web/20080703172817/http://www.plesiosaur.com/database/pdf/brown1913Leurospondylus.pdf
http://www.ppne.co.uk/index.php?m=show&id=12527

Late Cretaceous plesiosaurs of North America
Plesiosauria incertae sedis
Sauropterygian genera